Athina Bochori (born July 26, 1978) is a Greek former swimmer, who specialized in sprint freestyle events. She represented Greece at the 2000 Summer Olympics, held numerous Greek swimming records, including the 50 m freestyle, and also trained for Panathinaikos Athina Swim Club, under her longtime coach and mentor Evangelios Voultsou.

Bochori competed only in the women's 50 m freestyle at the 2000 Summer Olympics in Sydney. She achieved a FINA B-standard of 26.09 from Akropolis International Meet in Athens. She challenged seven other swimmers in heat seven, including Finland's 15-year-old Hanna-Maria Seppälä and Singapore's three-time Olympian Joscelin Yeo. Bochori closed out the field to last place in 26.90, almost a full second behind leader Jana Kolukanova of Estonia. Bochori failed to advance into the semifinals, as she placed forty-third out of 74 swimmers in the prelims.

References

External links
2000 Olympic Profile – Eideisis Ellinika 

1978 births
Living people
Greek female swimmers
Olympic swimmers of Greece
Panathinaikos swimmers
Swimmers at the 2000 Summer Olympics
Greek female freestyle swimmers
Swimmers from Volos